Germany had a hydropower installed capacity in 2016 of 11,258 MW, including 6,806 MW of pumped storage.
In the same year, the country generated 21.5 TWh from hydroelectric plants, representing about 3% of the country's total electricity generation.

The hydropower capacity in Germany is considered mature and the potential already almost completely exploited, with limited room for growth.
In recent years, growth in capacity has mainly come from repowering of existing plants.

See also
 Energy in Germany
 Electricity sector in Germany
 Renewable energy in Germany

References